Asunción is a district of the Chachapoyas Province, Peru. The District of Asunción is located in the northern part of the province in Amazonas Region; the capital is the town of Goncha.

The district covers an area of 25.71 km²; the elevation of the district capital is 2,820 above sea level. The climate is moderate to dry moderate cold.

The District of Asunción borders:
For the North: With the Bongará Province
For the South: With the Quinjalca District
For the East: With the Olleros District
For the West: With the Chiliquín District

External links
Asunción district official website 

1933 establishments in Peru
Districts of the Chachapoyas Province
Districts of the Amazonas Region